Valentín García Yebra (Lombillo de Los Barrios, Ponferrada, León, 28 April 1917 – Madrid, 13 December 2010), was a Spanish philologist, translator and translation scholar.

Biography
He studied Arts at Madrid where he graduated in Classical Philology (1944), then he got his doctoral degree with his thesis Las traducciones latinas de la metafísica de Aristóteles. After a long career as professor and scholar, in 1974 he boosted the creation of a Translation Institute at the Universidad Complutense, where he delivered lectures in Translation Theory.

During his career he was awarded several prizes, including the Spanish National Translation Award in 1998. From 1984 until his death he was a member of the Real Academia Española. In 1997 he joined the Academia Norteamericana de la Lengua Española.

Honors 
 Premio Nacional a la Obra de un Traductor (1998)
 Premio Nacional de Periodismo "Miguel Delibes" (2004) for his article "Desajustes gramaticales", published in ABC on 27 September 2004.
 Honorary member of Asetrad (2008) 
 Honorary member of IAPTI (2009).

Works 
Editorial Gredos, founded by García Yebra with fellow students, was in charge of publishing most of his books:

Translation 
 Aguiar e Silva, Vítor Manuel de, Teoría de la literatura (1996, 1st ed.). 
 Aristotle, Metafísica de Aristóteles (trilingual version), (1997, 2nd ed.). 
 ——, Poetics (trilingual version), (1992, 1st ed.). 
 Julius Caesar, Guerra de las Galias (1985/2001, 3 vol. bilingual edition)
 ——, Guerra de las Galias (1996/1999, 2 vol. with Latin notes)
 Cicero, De Amicitia, anotado (1987, 5th ed.). 
 Étienne Gilson, El realismo metódico (Encuentro Ediciones, S.A., 1997). 
 Oronzo Giordano, Religiosidad popular en la Alta Edad Media (1983, 1st ed.). 
 Gertrud von le Fort, Himnos a la iglesia (Encuentro Ediciones, S.A., 1995). 
 ——, El velo de Verónica (Encuentro Ediciones, S.A., 1998). 
 Charles Möeller, Literatura del siglo XX y cristianismo (6 vol.). 
 Friedrich Schleiermacher, Sobre los diferentes métodos de traducir (2000). 
 Lucius Annaeus Seneca, Medea (1982, 2nd ed./2001, 3rd ed.). /

Grammar and translation theory 
"Traducción y estilo", comunicación presentada al X Congreso Internacional de Lingüistas celebrado en Bucarest del 28 de agosto al 2 de septiembre de 1967
 Traducción y enriquecimiento de la lengua del traductor (1985 R.A.E./2004 Gredos). 
 Claudicación en el uso de preposiciones (1988). 
 En torno a la Traducción. Teoría. Crítica. Historia (1989, 2.ª ed.). 
 Traducción: Historia y Teoría (1994). 
 Teoría y Práctica de la Traducción (2 volúmenes), (1997, 3.ª ed. revisada). 
 Diccionario de galicismos prosódicos y morfológicos (1999). 
 Documentación, terminología y traducción (Editorial Síntesis, S.A., 2000, 1ª. edic., 2ª. impres.). 
 El buen uso de las palabras (2009). 
 Gonzalo García, Consuelo, et al., Manual de documentación para la traducción literaria (Arco Libros, S.L.,2005). 
 Experiencias de un traductor (2006).

References

External links 
 The translators' rights (in Spanish)

1917 births
2010 deaths
People from Ponferrada
Spanish translators
Spanish translation scholars
English–Spanish translators
French–Spanish translators
German–Spanish translators
Greek–Spanish translators
Italian–Spanish translators
Latin–Spanish translators
Portuguese–Spanish translators
Members of the Royal Spanish Academy
Complutense University of Madrid alumni
Academic staff of the Complutense University of Madrid
Complutense University of Madrid
20th-century translators
20th-century Spanish male writers
Commanders of the Order of Isabella the Catholic
Commanders of the Order of Alfonso X, the Wise